Lacy Schnoor (born June 12, 1985) is an American freestyle skier who has competed since 2003. Her best World Cup was eighth in an aerials event in Canada in 2007.

Schnoor's best finish at the FIS Freestyle World Ski Championships was seventh in the aerials at Inawashiro in 2009.

Schnoor qualified for the 2010 Winter Olympics on Christmas Eve 2009. She made her Olympic debut at the Women's Aerials event on February 20, 2010, finishing 9th.

References

External links

1985 births
American female freestyle skiers
Freestyle skiers at the 2010 Winter Olympics
Living people
Olympic freestyle skiers of the United States
21st-century American women